Blue Madonna is the second studio album by American musician Børns. It was released on January 12, 2018 through Interscope Records.

Background
On July 28, 2017, Børns released the single "Faded Heart" on Interscope Records. On September 29, 2017, he released his next single, "Sweet Dreams". Two promotional videos, "The Search for the Lost Sounds" and "The Faded Heart Sessions", were released on his YouTube channel along with the singles.

The album was announced via Instagram on December 4, 2017. A pre-order on blue vinyl (1,500 copies) was available on the Urban Outfitters website in December 2017, but the limited-edition sale was removed before its official release on January 12, 2018.

"Faded Heart", "Sweet Dreams", I Don't Want U Back", and "God Save Our Young Blood" featuring Lana Del Rey were released as singles prior to the official album release.

The official lyrics to "Supernatural" released the day prior as bonus material for Spotify users who pre-saved the album. Additionally, Børns, using an account on Genius.com, has taken to leaving personal commentaries regarding written lyrics on certain songs appearing on the album. For example, Børns says, "I pictured Lou Reed when I wrote this singing about being a glowing star with a fragile heart," about his song "Faded Heart".

Blue Madonna was officially released on January 12, 2018.

Track listing
Note: All tracks produced by Thomas Schleiter, who also goes by the name "Tommy English".

Notes
 "Supernatural" features theremin-playing by Armen Ra
 "Blue Madonna" features background vocals by Lana Del Rey.

Personnel
Long time collaborator Thomas Schleiter ("Tommy English") produced all the songs on the album, while it was mixed by Tony Maserati. String arrangements were by Steve Weisberg.

All tracks were published by These Are Songs of Pulse (ASCAP), while some were co-published by Me Gusta Music. Covers for the album and the singles were photographed by Lana Del Rey's sister Caroline "Chuck" Grant.

Charts

Appearances in other media
 "Faded Heart" is featured in the EA Sports video game FIFA 18
"Sweet Dreams" is featured in the Sony Pictures film Flatliners

References

Børns albums
2018 albums
Interscope Records albums